Kill Her Goats is an upcoming American slasher film written, produced and directed by Steve Wolsh. It stars Arielle Raycene, Ellie Gonsalves, Monica Sims, and Dani Mathers, with Kane Hodder as a killer known as "Goatface".

Kill Her Goats is set to be released on 4K UHD, Blu-ray, and video-on-demand (VOD) in 2023.

Cast
 Kane Hodder as Goatface
 Arielle Raycene as Audra
 Ellie Gonsalves as Missy Becks
 Dani Mathers as Haley
 Monica Sims as Reese
 Amberleigh West as Autumn

Production
Kill Her Goats was shot on location on Cape Cod in Massachusetts. Filming took place in October 2015. Ben Bornstein provided practical creature and gore effects for the film.

Release
Kill Her Goats is slated to be released on 4K UHD and Blu-ray as a "limited edition" SteelBook set, which is estimated to ship on March 1, 2023. Additional merchandise, including a soundtrack album and a Christmas ornament, were released.

References

External links
 
 

Upcoming films
American horror films
American slasher films
Films shot in Massachusetts